Slide is a song performed by French singer Bosh released in 2020.

Charts

Certifications

References

2020 singles
2020 songs
French-language songs
French hip hop songs
Funk songs